This list of songs about Hamburg is about songs dedicated to or involving the city, state and port of Hamburg, Germany. 

Traditionally, Hamburg has been associated with a number of sea shanties, and Low German folk music and Schlager, added by Hamburger Schule rock and pop during the early 1980s, and alternative rock and hip hop during the early 1990s. Most notable recent musicians with work about the Hanseatic city are ECHO Award winners Udo Lindenberg, Fettes Brot and Revolverheld; international artists include Frank Boeijen, Keane, Édith Piaf and Tom Waits.

List 

Note: this list should exclude songs where Hamburg is simply name-checked (like in "London, Hamburg, Paris, Rome, [...]", lyrics of "All Over the World" by the Electric Light Orchestra) or barely mentioned in a few lines (like in "Every Fucking City" by Paul Kelly).

18th century 
 1723: "Hamburger Ebb’ und Fluth" (water music) by Georg Philipp Telemann (baroque)
 1723: "Hamburg Admiralty Music" by Georg Philipp Telemann (baroque)
 1786: "Hamburg Sonata" (Sonata in G major, Wq 133) by Carl Philipp Emanuel Bach (baroque)

19th century 
 1828: "Stadt Hamburg an der Elbe Auen" by Albert Methfessel (official Hamburg Anthem)
 1850: "De Hamborger Veermaster" (shanty)
 1870: "Rolling Home" (shanty) 
 1888: "Mondnacht auf der Alster" by Oscar Fetrás (waltz)

20th century

1910s  
 1911: "Dat Paddelboot" by the Wolf Brothers
 1911: "En echt Hamborger Jung" by the Wolf Brothers
 1912: "Snuten un Poten" by the Wolf Brothers
 1912: "On the Reeperbahn at Half Past Midnight" by Ralph Arthur Roberts 
 1917: "An de Eck steiht ’n Jung mit ’n Tüdelband" by the Wolf Brothers

1920s  
 1926: "Mein Hamburg, ich hab dich so lieb" by Charly Wittong
 1926: "En echt Hamborger Deern" by Charly Wittong
 1926: "De Hamborger Jung" by Charly Wittong
 1926: "[Hamburg am Elbstrand,] Hamburg ist ein schönes Städtchen" (shanty)

1940s  
 1941: "Under the Red Lantern of St. Pauli" by Lale Andersen
 1944: "On the Reeperbahn at Half Past Midnight" by Hans Albers from picture Große Freiheit Nr. 7
 1946: "An de Alster, an de Elbe, an de Bill" by Artur Schulenburg

1950s  
 195?: "In Hamburg liegt ein Segelschiff im Hafen" by Die Travellers
 1952: "So was Dummes" by Richard Germers
 1954: "On the Reeperbahn at Half Past Midnight" by Hans Albers from picture On the Reeperbahn at Half Past Midnight
 1955: "C'est à Hambourg" by Édith Piaf
 1957: "The Heart of St. Pauli" by Hans Albers from picture The Heart of St. Pauli
 1958: "Das Mädchen aus Hamburg" by Hildegard Knef from picture La Fille de Hambourg

1960s  

 1962: "Heimweh nach St. Pauli" by Freddy Quinn 
 1964: "In Hamburg when the Nights are long" by Lale Andersen
 1965: "An de Alster, an de Elbe, an de Bill" by Richard Germer
 1966: "[Hamburg du schöne Stadt] Eh du mon Dieu, mon Dieu!" by Frank Wedekind

1970s  
 1970: "In Hamburg sagt man Tschüss" by Heidi Kabel  
 1970: "Der Junge von St. Pauli" by Freddy Quinn
 1971: "Hamburger Midnight" from the album Little Feat by Little Feat 
 1973: "Hamburg" by Freddy Quinn
 1974: "Hamburg im Regen" by Mary Roos 
 1974: "In Hamburg sind die Nächte lang" by Leinemann 
 1974: "Hamburg '75" by Gottfried & Lonzo
 1975: "Action Strasse" from the album Tomorrow Belongs to Me by The Sensational Alex Harvey Band (rock)
 1975: "Kitsch" from the album Kitsch by Randy Pie 
 197?: "An de Eck steit'n Jung mit'n Tüdelband" by Heidi Kabel
 1978: "Reeperbahn" by Udo Lindenberg
 1979: "Zwischen Hamburg und München" from the album Etwas von mir by Roland Kaiser (schlager)

1980s  

 1980: "Der wilde wilde Westen [fängt gleich hinter Hamburg an]" by Truck Stop (country)
 1981: "Ich mag" by Volker Lechtenbrink (schlager)
 1981: various songs from the album Otto versaut Hamburg by Otto Waalkes
 1981: "Low Life" by The Police
 1981: "Hamburg" from the album Der Montag ist am schlimmsten by The Delta Blues Band (Bernd Haake) 
 1984: "Große Freiheit Nr. 7" by Freddy Quinn 
 1985: "Bomben auf Hamburg" from the album Die Tricks des Glücks by Felix De Luxe (pop)
 1985: "Hamburg um vier" from the album Dein ist mein ganzes Herz by Heinz Rudolf Kunze
 1986: "Hamburg-City" by Freddy Quinn 
 1986: "Livin' in Hamburg" by Hamburger Arroganz (electro)
 1987: "Unten am Hafen" by Die Antwort (Bernd Begemann)
 1987: "Winter in Hamburg" by Frank Boeijen
 1989: "In Hamburg, da bin ich zu Haus" by Freddy Quinn
 1989: "Hammonia – Mein Hamburg, ich liebe dich" by Heidi Kabel  feat. Freddy Quinn

1990s  
 1990: "Das gibt's nur auf der Reeperbahn bei Nacht" by Heidi Kabel feat. Freddy Quinn 
 1992: "Hamburg" by Lassie Singers 
 1992: "Take Me to Hamburg" from the bootleg album The American Landscape by Marc Cohn
 1993: "Caught up the Reeperbahn!" from the album Absurd-Ditties by the Toy Dolls (punk) 
 1995: "Nordisch By Nature" by Fettes Brot (hip hop)
 1995: "Hamburg Lied" by Trinkende Jugend from the compilation album Wo Ist Zuhause Mama (pop)
 1995: "Hamburg rockt" from the album Digital ist besser by Tocotronic 
 1996: "Oh, St. Pauli" from the album Jetzt bist Du in Talkshows by Bernd Begemann
 1996: "Hamburg, 8°, Regen" by Rantanplan
 1996: "Mitten in Barmbek" from the album Weiß' Bescheid?! by Lotto King Karl
 1997: "Nach Bahrenfeld im Bus" from the album Es ist egal, aber by Tocotronic
 1997: "Heiligengeistfeld" by Kante feat. Freewheelin' Knarf Rellöm
 1999: "My German Fräulein" from the album Hungry Sally & Other Killer Lullabies by Tito & Tarantula (rock)
 1999: "Hamburg Concerto" by György Ligeti

21st century

2000s 

 2000: "Hamburg, meine Perle" from the album Bier her, Now by Lotto King Karl
 2000: "Unten am Hafen" from the album Bier her, Now by Lotto King Karl 
 2001: "Hamburg" from the album Foresights by Beat Crusaders  
 2001: "Hamburger Berg" by AussenBorder
 2002: "Reeperbahn" from the album Alice by Tom Waits (rock)
 2002: "Wenn dir St. Pauli auf den Geist fällt" by Die Sterne
 2003: "Landungsbrücken raus" by Kettcar  
 2003: "City Blues" from the album Blast Action Heroes by Beginner 
 2003: "Große Stadt am großen Strom" by Jochen Wiegandt
 2003: "Mein Hamburg lieb ich sehr" by Abschlach! 
 2004: "Im Innern der Stadt" by Kante 
 2005: "Hamburg Ciddy" by Maggers United  
 2005: "In Altona trank ich mal einen guten Kaffee" by Kevin Hamann
 2005: "Hamburg '75" by Element of Crime 
 2006: "Hamburg Song" from the album Under the Iron Sea by Keane 
 2006: "Hamburger Jungs" by Eight Balls (punk) 
 2007: "St Pauli" from the album It's a Bit Complicated by Art Brut 
 2008: "Wie sieht's aus in Hamburg?" from the album Heureka by Tomte (indie)
 2008: "Hamburch" by Willy Astor
 2008: "Hamburg Calling" by Fettes Brot 
 2008: "Das Hamburg Lied" by Hamburger Jungz
 2009: "Hamburg 2009" from the album Der letzte Tanz by Samy Deluxe
 2009: "Chasing Hamburg" from the album Chasing Hamburg by Polar Bear Club (indie rock)

2010s  
 2010: "Hamburg Hotel" from the album Barking by Underworld (electronic) 
 2010: "Hamburg hinter uns" from the album In Farbe by Revolverheld 
 2011: "Reeperbahn" from the album I Love You Dude by Digitalism (electronic)
 2012: "Reeperbahn 2011" by Udo Lindenberg feat. Jan Delay
 2013: "Echohäuser" by The Good, The Bad and The Ugly
 2013: "Hamburg Song" from the album Someone New by Chanticleer
 2015: "Reeperbahn" from the album "Moth Boys" by Spector
 2016: "Ahnma" from the album Advanced Chemistry by Beginner
 2016: "Hamburg Drunk" from the album The Devil, The Heart and The Fight by Skinny Lister
 2017: "Gangs United" by Raico Ebel Video on YouTube
2018: "Hotel St. Pauli" from the album Things you leave behind by Rebekka Bakken

References

External links  

 
 

 

!Songs
Songs
Hamburg
Hamburg